Kiri may refer to:

People
 Kiri (given name), a given name (and list of people with the name)
 Kiri Te Kanawa (born 1944), New Zealand soprano
 Riku Kiri (born 1963), Finnish weight lifter
 Solomon Kiri (fl. 1990s), New Zealand rugby player

Places
 Kiri, Democratic Republic of the Congo, a community in Bandundu Province
 Kiri Territory, Bandundu Province, Democratic Republic of the Congo

Other uses
 , several ships
 Kiri (TV series), British television drama series
 Kiri Airport
 Breuvages Kiri, an independent bottler of soft drinks
 Paulownia tomentosa, a tree
 Kiri (cheese brand), a brand of cheese by Bel Group
 "Kiri", a song by Monoral

See also 
 
 Kiri Noh, a category of Noh
 Government Seal of Japan